STDC may refer to:

Sha Tin District Council, the district council for the Sha Tin District in Hong Kong
Sindh Tourism Development Corporation, an organization of the Government of Sindh, Pakistan
South Tees Development Corporation, the first Mayoral Development Corporation outside Greater London to be established under the Cities and Local Government Devolution Act 2016